Called Back is a 1914 American silent drama film directed by Otis Turner and starring Herbert Rawlinson, Ann Little and Allan Forrest. It is based on the 1883 novel Called Back by Hugh Conway, which was also adapted into a British film Called Back the same year.

Plot

Cast
 Herbert Rawlinson as Gilbert Vaughan 
 Ann Little as Pauline March 
 Allan Forrest as Anthony March 
 William Worthington as Dr. Manuel Ceneri 
 William Quinn as Signor Macari

References

Bibliography
 George A. Katchmer. Eighty Silent Film Stars: Biographies and Filmographies of the Obscure to the Well Known. McFarland, 1991.

External links
 

1914 films
1914 drama films
1910s English-language films
American silent feature films
Silent American drama films
Films directed by Otis Turner
American black-and-white films
Films set in London
Universal Pictures films
1910s American films